Beckham Putra Nugraha (born 29 October 2001) is an Indonesian professional footballer who plays as a midfielder for Liga 1 club Persib Bandung and the Indonesia national under-23 team.

Club career

Early career 
Beckham is a member of the U-19 Persib squad that won 2018 Liga 1 U-19. He finished the 2018 season as the top scorer with 9 goals.

Persib Bandung 
Beckham's stunning performances in the 2018 League 1 U-19 event made him promoted to the Persib senior team by the coach Miljan Radović. Beckham made his debut for Persib on 15 August 2018 in the match Piala Indonesia 2018–19 when his team against PSKC Cimahi. He scored his first goal for Persib on 11 February 2019 in the last 32 against Persiwa Wamena in the 79th minute.

On 18 September 2021, Beckham scored his first official league goal for Persib with scored a brace in 2021–22 Liga 1, earning them a 2–2 draw over Bali United.

Personal life 
Beckham has an older brother who's also a footballer, Gian Zola.

Career statistics

Club

Notes

International goals

Indonesia U19

Honours

International
Indonesia U-19
 AFF U-19 Youth Championship third place: 2019

Club
Persib U-19
Liga 1 U-19: 2018

Individual
 Liga 1 U-19 Top Goalscorer: 2018 (9 goals)
FWP Award 2019: Young Player of the Year
Persib Bandung Young Player of the Year 2021–22
Liga 1 Young Player of the Month: September 2022

See also
 Gian Zola

References

External links
 
 Beckham Putra at Liga Indonesia

2001 births
Living people
Sportspeople from Bandung
Sportspeople from West Java
Indonesian footballers
Liga 1 (Indonesia) players
Persib Bandung players
Indonesia youth international footballers
Association football midfielders
21st-century Indonesian people